Lucien Aigner (14 September 1901 – 29 March 1999) was a Hungarian photojournalist.

Life and work
Aigner was born in Érsekújvár, Austria-Hungary (now called Nové Zámky in Slovakia).

His first camera, a Brownie, was acquired at age nine and was used to photograph his family. By 1926, Aigner was a reporter for Az Est, the Hungarian newspaper group, and soon became a photographer with them. During this time, Aigner started using a Leica camera.

As the Paris correspondent of the London General Press at the Stresa Conference of 1935, Aigner photographed Benito Mussolini, who was about to sneeze as the picture was taken. The photo made the cover of Newsweek in 1940, and established Aigner as a photojournalist. In 1941 he emigrated from France to the United States to escape Nazi persecution.

He then spent time at Princeton University taking photographs of Albert Einstein. The photos of Einstein are among Aigner's most famous, and were reportedly Einstein's favorite photos of himself.

Aigner was the older brother of fashionable leather-goods manufacturer Etienne Aigner.

He died in Waltham, Massachusetts.

References
 Jeffrey, Ian et al. (1997). The Photography Book. London: Phaidon Press. 
Lucien Aigner: Picture Stories: Vintage Early Works: 17 April – 16 June 2001. Bruce Silverstein Gallery.

External links
 Biography and image collection at Luminous-Lint

1901 births
1999 deaths
People from Nové Zámky
Hungarian photographers
American photojournalists
Hungarian emigrants to the United States